James Allan Schamus (born September 7, 1959) is an American screenwriter, producer, business executive, film historian, professor, and director. He is a frequent collaborator of Ang Lee, the co-founder of the production company Good Machine, and the co-founder and former CEO of motion picture production, financing, and worldwide distribution company Focus Features, a subsidiary of NBCUniversal. He is currently president of the New York-based production company Symbolic Exchange, and is Professor of Professional Practice at Columbia University, where he has taught film history and theory since 1989.

Life and career
Schamus was born in Detroit, Michigan, to a Jewish family. He is the son of Clarita (Gershowitz) Karlin and Julian John Schamus, and was raised in Los Angeles. He is married to writer Nancy Kricorian, with whom he has two children.

His output includes writing or co-writing The Ice Storm, Eat, Drink, Man, Woman, Crouching Tiger, Hidden Dragon and Hulk (all directed by Ang Lee), and producing Brokeback Mountain and Alone in Berlin. At Focus he oversaw the production and distribution of Lost in Translation, Milk, Eternal Sunshine of the Spotless Mind, Coraline, and The Kids Are All Right. In addition to his tenure at Columbia University, he has also taught at Yale University and at Rutgers University. He is the author of Carl Theodor Dreyer's Gertrud: The Moving Word, published by the University of Washington Press. He earned his BA, MA, and Ph.D. in English from University of California, Berkeley.

Schamus made his feature directorial debut with Indignation, an adaptation of Philip Roth's novel of the same name. Schamus also wrote the script for the film, which stars Logan Lerman, Sarah Gadon, and Tracy Letts, and is the story of a Jewish student at an Ohio college in 1951. The film premiered at the 2016 Sundance Film Festival, and was theatrically released by Roadside Attractions on July 29, 2016.

He was president of the jury for the 64th Berlin International Film Festival. He has also been on the jury of the New York International Children's Film Festival, and has served on the editorial boards of Film Quarterly and Cinema Journal, as well as on the board of Creative Capital and the Heyman Center for the Humanities.

Film credits

Executive producer only
 Poison (1991)
 Swoon (1992)
 Safe (1995)
 Happiness (1998)
 Lola and Billy the Kid (1999)
 Buffalo Soldiers (2001)
 Auto Focus (2002)
 Suffragette (2015)
 Junction 48 (2015)
 Dayveon (2017)
 A Prayer Before Dawn (2017)
 Furlough (2018)

Career recognition and honors
 ShowEast's Bingham Ray Spirit Award, October 2016                    
 18th annual Outfest Achievement Award, June 2014                    
 President of the Jury, Berlin International Film Festival, February 2014
 Evelyn Burkey Award, Writers Guild of America, January 2014
 Hamptons Film Festival, Industry Toast, October 2012
 Point Foundation, Point Inspiration Award, April 2012
 Gotham Independent Film Project Awards, Career Tribute, November 2010
 San Francisco Film Festival Kanbar Lifetime Achievement Award for Screenwriting, April 2010
 The Hollywood Reporter Independent Icon Award, Sundance, January 2010
 National Arts Club, Medal of Honor for Film, November 2009.
 9th Annual Woodstock Film Festival, Trailblazer Award, October 2008
 19th Annual GLAAD (Gay Lesbian Alliance Against Discrimination) Media Awards, Golden Gate Award, May 2008
 American Museum of the Moving Image Honoree, April 2008
 ShoWest/NATO (National Association of Theatre Owners) Freedom of Expression Award, March 2008
 Golden Horse Award, Best Film, Best Screenplay Adaptation (James Schamus and Wang Hui-ling), "Lust, Caution," 2007
 Jacob Burns Film Center, Vision Award, September 2007
 British Academy of Film and Television Arts, Best Film, "Brokeback Mountain," 2005
 21st Israel Film Festival, Visionary Award, November 2005
 Presidential Fellow in the Arts, University of Chicago, November 2005
 Producers Guild of America, Darryl Zanuck Award for Producer of the Year, 2005
 Los Angeles Film Critics Association, Best Picture of the Year, "Brokeback Mountain," 2005
 New York Film Critics Circle, Best Picture, "Brokeback Mountain," 2005
 Out Magazine, Out 100 Award, 2005
 Distinguished Entertainment Industry Award, Anti-Defamation League, 2005
 Writers Guild of America East, Richard B. Jablow Award for Devoted Service to the Guild, March 2002
 NBC Screenwriters Tribute, Nantucket Film Festival, 2002
 Grammy Award Nomination, Best Song Written For A Motion Picture, Television, Or Other Media, "A Love Before Time" from Crouching Tiger, Hidden Dragon, 2002
 Hugo Award, Best Dramatic Presentation for Crouching Tiger, Hidden Dragon, 2001
 Excellence in Achievement Award, California Alumni Association, 2001
 Crystal Apple Award, New York City Mayor's Office, 2001
 Provincetown International Film Festival, Filmmaker on the Edge Award, 2001
 Yale Film Studies Award, Yale University, 2000
 Achievement Award, Jerusalem Cinematheque, 2000
 British Film Critics' Circle Awards Nomination, Best Screenwriter, "The Ice Storm," 1999.
 Gladys Borchers Lecturer, University of Wisconsin, 1998.
 Nuveen Fellow, University of Chicago, 1997
 University Lecturer, Columbia University, 1997
 Cable Ace Award, Best Historical Documentary Special or Series, "Wonderland," (Executive Producer), 1997
 IFP Gotham Award, Producer of the Year, 1996
 Zanuck Award Nominee, Producers Guild of America, 1996
 Nova Award, Producers Guild of America, 1996
 The Philip and Ruth Hettleman Award, Columbia University School of General Studies, 1996                                                    
 Independent Spirit Brian Greenbaum Memorial Award for Producing, 1994

Writing

Books 
 Taking Woodstock. New York: Newmarket Press, 2009. Screenplay and Introduction.
 Carl Theodor Dryer's Gertrud: The Moving Word. Seattle: University of Washington Press, 2008.
 Lust, Caution. New York: Pantheon, 2007. Screenplay (with Wang Hui-Ling) and Introduction.
 The Hulk. New York: Newmarket Press, 2003. Screenplay and Introduction.
 Crouching Tiger, Hidden Dragon: Portrait of the Ang Lee Film. New York: Newmarket Press, 2000. Screenplay (with Wang Hui-Ling) and Notes.
 Ride With the Devil. London: Faber & Faber, 1999. Screenplay, Introduction, and Notes.
 The Ice Storm. New York: Newmarket Press, 1997. Screenplay, Introduction, and Notes.
 Two Films By Ang Lee: "Eat Drink Man Woman" and "The Wedding Banquet". New York: The Overlook Press, 1994. Introduction and Screenplays (with Ang Lee, Neal Peng, and Wang Hui-Ling).

Essays and articles
 "23 Fragments on the Future of Cinema", Filmmaker (magazine) , Winter 2015.
 "Hollywood is Not American", The Hollywood Reporter, October 17, 2014.
 "James Schamus Reveals Secrets of the Oscar Voting System", Variety (magazine), January 8, 2014.
 "Preface." "Musts, Maybes, and Nevers: A Book About The Movies". By David Picker. Charleston: CreateSpace, 2013. 
 "See Here Now: Festival Red Carpets and the Cost of Film Culture," in Coming Soon to a Festival Near You: Programming Film Festivals, ed. Jeffrey Ruoff. Scotland, UK: St. Andrews Film Books, 2012.
 "Raul Ruiz Remembered by James Schamus", Filmmaker (magazine), August 19, 2011.
 "Afterword." A Killer Life. By Christine Vachon. New York: Limelight Editions, 2007.
 "The Apartment", The New York Times, November 4, 2007.
 "Next Year in Munich: Masculinity, Zionism and Diaspora in Spielberg's Epic," Representations, Fall 2007, no. 100. 
 "'Brokeback Mountain': An Exchange", The New York Review of Books, April 6, 2006.
 "Oy", Filmmaker, March 24, 2006.
 "Aesthetic Identities: A Response to Kenneth Chan and Christina Klein", Cinema Journal, Summer 2004, Volume 43, Number 4.
 "Dreyer's Textual Realism." Rites of Realism: Essays on Corporeal Cinema, Ivone Margulies, ed., Duke UP, 2003.
 "Sing to Us, Muse, of the Rage of the Hulk", The New York Times, May 11, 2003.
 "Whatever Happened to B Movies?", Filmmaker (magazine), Fall, 2002 (reprinted from The Off Hollywood Report, Fall 1990).
 "A Rant." The End of Cinema As We Know It: American Film in the Nineties, Jon Lewis, ed., NYU Press, 2002.
 "Fragments Towards an Introduction to Elia Sulieman's Chronicles." Filmmaker, Winter 2002.
 "16 Fragments on Auteur Theory, or Sarris's Revenge." Citizen Sarris: American Film Critic, Emanuel Levy, ed., Scarecrow Press, 2001.
 "Talking Pictures", Filmmaker, Winter, 2001. 
 "HOLIDAY FILMS; The Polyglot Task of Writing the Global Film", The New York Times, November 5, 2000.
 "IFP Rant", Filmmaker, Spring, 2000.
 "The Pursuit of Happiness: Making an Art of Marketing an Explosive Film", The Nation, April 5–12, 1999.
 "20 Fragments on the Art of Screenwriting." Scenario, Summer 1996.
 "Long Live Indie Film", Filmmaker, Fall, 1995.

Profiles and interviews
 "Indignation director James Schamus: Film is Dead, And That's Okay" Indiewire. August 1, 2016.
 "Indignation Interview" Indiewire. February, 2016.
 "James Schamus Directing Debut Indignation Wins Over Sundance Audience" The Wrap. January 24, 2016.
 "Indignation: Sundance Review" The Hollywood Reporter. January 25, 2016.  
 "Accidental CEO The College. Summer 2014.
 "Case Study: James Schamus", Produced By. October 2014.
 "James Schamus: 'The job is an ego crushing ass-kick to the soul. I love it!'", The Guardian. January 28, 2014.
 "On James Schamus and Focus Features", Filmmaker. October 3, 2013.
 "The Man Behind the Movies", California Magazine (Cal Alumni Association). Fall, 2013. 
 "The Professor of Micropopularity", The New York Times. November 26, 2010.
 "Ang Lee + James Schamus: A Pinewood Dialogue", Museum of the Moving Image. November 9, 2007.
 "The Professor in the Back Lot", The New York Times. September 17, 2006.
 "A Conversation with Tony Kushner," On Writing (Writers Guild of America, East): New York. Fall, 2005.

References

External links
 
The Career Cookbook James Schamus Profile
Columbia University Faculty 
Interview at The Minnesota Review

1959 births
Film producers from Michigan
Jewish American screenwriters
American male screenwriters
Columbia University faculty
Filmmakers who won the Best Film BAFTA Award
Living people
Writers from Detroit
Screenwriters from New York (state)
Screenwriters from Michigan
Nebula Award winners
American independent film production company founders
Cannes Film Festival Award for Best Screenplay winners
21st-century American Jews
Hugo Award-winning writers